Eric Tedd Harless (born July 13, 1962) is a Texas Republican politician that serves district 126 in the Texas House of Representatives.

He is the husband of Patricia Harless.

Personal life
In 1981 Harless graduated from Spring High School, he then attended Lone Star College, and later attended Sam Houston State University. He married Patricia Fincher in 1986, they have one son. Harless is a member of Champion Forest Baptist Church.

Today, he and his wife Patricia own Fred Fincher Motors, a second-generation independent automobile dealership.

His wife Patricia served in the Texas House representing the same District from 2007 – 2016.

Political career
Harless serves in the Texas House of Representatives for district 126. He was sworn in on January 8, 2019 succeeding Kevin Roberts. Harless is affiliated with the Republican Party.

References

Sam Houston State University alumni
21st-century American politicians
Republican Party members of the Texas House of Representatives
Living people
1962 births